The following public artworks have been installed in Las Vegas:

 Atomic Tumbleweed (Wayne Littlejohn)
 Big Edge (Nancy Rubins)
 Bliss Dance (Marco Cochrane)
 Dream Machine (Wayne Littlejohn)
 Flashlight (Claes Oldenburg and Coosje van Bruggen)
 LGBT Mural
 Monument to the Simulacrum
 Paintbrush Gateway
 Spin Baby (Wayne Littlejohn)
 Time Heals All Wounds
 Vaquero
 Welcome to Fabulous Las Vegas sign

References

 
Culture of Las Vegas
Public art
Las Vegas
Tourist attractions in Las Vegas